Wild Gift is the second studio album by American rock band X, released on May 4, 1981 by Slash Records. It was very well received critically, and was voted the year's second best album in The Village Voices Pazz & Jop poll. Wild Gift was later ranked at number 334 on Rolling Stone magazine's list of the 500 greatest albums of all time.

Wild Gift showcases the band's unique punk rock style, which infuses roots rock, country, blues, R&B, and rockabilly.

In 1988, Slash issued Los Angeles and Wild Gift jointly on a single compact disc. Wild Gift was remastered and reissued in 2001 by Rhino Records, with seven bonus tracks.

The track "White Girl" was sampled by the Red Hot Chili Peppers on their 1989 album Mother's Milk, in the song "Good Time Boys". The Chili Peppers song's lyrics mentioned X's John Doe specifically, "whose voice is made of gold".

Critical reception

In The Village Voices Pazz & Jop critics' poll for 1981, Wild Gift was ranked at number two, behind Sandinista! by the Clash.

In Christgau's Record Guide: The '80s (1990), critic Robert Christgau lauded Wild Gift, writing:

Christgau later ranked Wild Gift third on his "Personal Best" list for the 1980s, the highest placing of any rock album. Wild Gift was ranked at number 334 on Rolling Stones list of "The 500 Greatest Albums of All Time".

Track listing
All tracks written by John Doe and Exene Cervenka.

Side one
 "The Once Over Twice" – 2:31
 "We're Desperate" – 2:00
 "Adult Books" – 3:19
 "Universal Corner" – 4:33
 "I'm Coming Over" – 1:14
 "It's Who You Know" – 2:17

Side two
 "In This House That I Call Home" – 3:34
 "Some Other Time" – 2:17
 "White Girl" – 3:27
 "Beyond and Back" – 2:49
 "Back 2 the Base" – 1:33
 "When Our Love Passed Out on the Couch" – 1:57
 "Year 1" – 1:18

Bonus tracks (2001 reissue)
 "Beyond and Back" (Live) – 2:48
 "Blue Spark" (Demo) – 2:04
 "We're Desperate" (Single version) – 2:01
 "Back 2 the Base" (Live) – 1:40
 "Heater" (Rehearsal) (Doe) – 2:32
 "White Girl" (Single Mix) – 3:29
 "The Once Over Twice" (Unissued Single Mix) – 2:35

Bonus tracks (2019 Remaster) (Digital Release)
 "Beyond and Back" (Live) – 2:48
 "We're Desperate" [Explicit] (Live) – 2:31
 "Year 1" (Live) – 1:26

Personnel
X
John Doe – bass, vocals
Exene – vocals
Billy Zoom – guitar
D.J. Bonebrake – drums

Charts

References

External links

Wild Gift (Adobe Flash) at Radio3Net (streamed copy where licensed)

1981 albums
X (American band) albums
Slash Records albums
Albums produced by Ray Manzarek